The name Abby has been used as a name for six tropical cyclones worldwide, three in the Atlantic Ocean and three in the Western Pacific Ocean.

In the Atlantic:
 Hurricane Abby (1960) – a Category 2 hurricane that made landfall in British Honduras (now Belize)
 Tropical Storm Abby (1964) – made landfall in Texas
 Hurricane Abby (1968) – a Category 1 hurricane that made landfall in Cuba and then in Florida

In the Western Pacific:
 Typhoon Abby (1979) (Barang) – a Category 3 typhoon that did not approach land
 Typhoon Abby (1983) (Diding) – a Category 5 super typhoon that impacted Japan as a weakening system
 Typhoon Abby (1986) (Norming) – a Category 2 typhoon that hit Taiwan

Atlantic hurricane set index articles
Pacific typhoon set index articles